Jerry Bridges (December 4, 1929 – March 6, 2016) was an evangelical Christian author, speaker and staff member of The Navigators.  Born in Tyler, Texas, United States, he was the author of more than a dozen books, including The Pursuit of Holiness, which has sold more than one million copies.  His devotional Holiness Day by Day garnered the 2009 ECPA Christian Book Award for the inspiration and gift category, and The Discipline of Grace received a similar award in 1995 for the Christian living category.

Bridges earned his undergraduate degree in engineering at the University of Oklahoma before serving as an officer in the United States Navy during the Korean War. He joined Christian discipleship organization The Navigators in 1955, where he served as administrative assistant to the Europe Director, office manager for the headquarters office, Secretary-Treasurer of the organization, and as Vice President for Corporate Affairs before moving to a staff development position with the Collegiate Mission.

At the time of his death, he was a widower, and had married Jane Mallot a year after his first wife's death. Bridges died on March 6, 2016, in Colorado Springs, Colorado, at the age of 86.

Publications
The Pursuit of Holiness, NavPress (1978) 
The Practice of Godliness, NavPress (1983) 
 .
 .
 .
Transforming Grace, NavPress (1993) 
The Joy of Fearing God, Random House (1999) 
I Exalt You, O God: Encountering His Greatness in Your Private Worship, Random House (2000) 
I Give You Glory, O God, Random House (2002) 
The Chase: Pursuing Holiness in Your Everyday Life, NavPress (2003) 
The Gospel For Real Life, NavPress (2003) 
Growing Your Faith: How to Mature in Christ, NavPress (2004) 
Is God Really in Control? Trusting God in a World of Terrorism, Tsunamis, and Personal Tragedy, NavPress (2006) 
The Discipline of Grace, NavPress (2006) 
The Fruitful Life:The Overflow of God's Love Through You, NavPress (2006) 
 .
 .
 .
 .
 .

References

External links

1929 births
2016 deaths
20th-century evangelicals
21st-century evangelicals
People from Tyler, Texas
University of Oklahoma alumni
American evangelists
Evangelical writers
Writers from Texas
American Calvinist and Reformed Christians
United States Navy officers
United States Navy personnel of the Korean War
Military personnel from Texas